Art Blakey Big Band (also called Art Blakey's Big Band and Art Blakey and his Drivin' Big Band) is an album by drummer Art Blakey recorded in late 1957 and originally released on the Bethlehem label. It differs from typical Art Blakey releases as his regular quintet was expanded to form a big band for these arrangements.

In the mid-'90s, and again in the 2000s, this album was repackaged and released under John Coltrane's name, combining it with several songs from Winner's Circle, another album featuring Coltrane and recorded for the Bethlehem label in 1957. This edition is of note as it features several alternate takes which were released here for the first time.

Reception

Allmusic awarded the album 2½ stars stating "Throughout his long career as a bandleader, drummer Art Blakey very rarely played with big bands. This Bethlehem date was a one-shot affair, an opportunity for his powerful drumming to be heard propelling a 15-piece orchestra through a set of mostly new material".

Track listing 
 "Midriff" (Gerald Valentine) – 3:17   
 "Ain't Life Grand" (Al Cohn) – 3:21   
 "Tippin'" (Donald Byrd) – 6:23   
 "Pristine" (John Coltrane) – 5:35   
 "El Toro Valiente" (Charles Gambel, Chiefy Salaam) – 2:43   
 "The Kiss of No Return" (Gambel, Salaam) – 5:37   
 "Late Date" (Melba Liston) – 3:33   
 "The Outer World" (Cohn) – 4:06

Personnel 
Art Blakey – drums  
Ray Copeland (tracks 1, 2 & 5–8), Bill Hardman (tracks 1, 2 & 5–8), Idrees Sulieman (tracks 1, 2 & 5–8), Donald Byrd – trumpet
Frank Rehak, Jimmy Cleveland, Melba Liston – trombone (tracks 1, 2 & 5–8)  
Bill Graham, Sahib Shihab – alto saxophone (tracks 1, 2 & 5–8) (feature: track 6)
Al Cohn (tracks 1, 2 & 5–8), John Coltrane – tenor saxophone  
 Bill Slapin – baritone saxophone (tracks 1, 2 & 5–8)
Walter Bishop, Jr. – piano
Wendell Marshall – bass
 “Tippin” & “Pristine” feature a quintet of Donald Byrd, John Coltrane, Walter Bishop Jr., Wendell Marshall, and Blakey.

References 

Art Blakey albums
1959 albums
Bethlehem Records albums